Robert Renner may refer to:

 Robert G. Renner (1923–2005), United States federal judge
 Robert Renner (athlete) (born 1994), Slovenian pole vaulter

See also 
 Renner (disambiguation)